Henry Smith (born 9 April 1996) is an Australian long jumper. In 2019, he competed in the men's long jump at the 2019 World Athletics Championships held in Doha, Qatar. He did not qualify to compete in the final.

References

External links 
 

Living people
1996 births
Place of birth missing (living people)
Australian male long jumpers
World Athletics Championships athletes for Australia